The Algerian Petroleum Institute, is a national graduate institute of petroleum engineering located in Boumerdès, Algeria. Commonly known as "IAP", the school was established in 1965 in collaboration with the French Institute of Petroleum (French: Institut Français du Pétrole, IFP) with a mission of providing graduate engineers and high skilled technicians to Sonatrach, the national state-owned oil company of Algeria.

See also 

 Sonatrach
 Petroleum industry
 Economy of Algeria

References 

Educational organisations based in Algeria
Companies of Algeria
Non-renewable resource companies established in 1965
1965 establishments in Algeria
Boumerdès Province